Teliana Pereira was the defending champion, but lost in the first round to Catalina Pella.

Irina Falconi won her first WTA title, defeating Sílvia Soler Espinosa in the final, 6–2, 2–6, 6–4.

Seeds

Draw

Finals

Top half

Bottom half

Qualifying

Seeds

Qualifiers

Draw

First qualifier

Second qualifier

Third qualifier

Fourth qualifier

Fifth qualifier

Sixth qualifier

References
 Main Draw
 Qualifying Draw

Copa Sony Ericsson Colsanitas - Singles
2015 Singles